Shag Point / Matakaea is a headland and township in East Otago, New Zealand.

It is located close to State Highway 1 nine kilometres to the northeast of Palmerston, at the southern end of a long open bay known as Katiki Beach. The point itself is a hilly promontory between Katiki Beach and the mouth of the Shag River. Both the river and point take their English name from the shag, a species of cormorant.

A historic Māori site, the Matakaea/Shag Point Occupation Site, is located close to the headland. It is listed as a Category II site by Heritage New Zealand.

Geologically, the area is an exemplar of the Katiki Formation, and the site of the discovery of the plesiosaur Kaiwhekea katiki. It is also the location of the oldest characterised ignimbrite deposit in the South Island at 112 million years ago.

References

Headlands of Otago
Populated places in Otago
Heritage New Zealand Category 2 historic places in Otago